This is a progressive list of men's association footballers who have held or co-held the South American record for international caps since 1902.

Criteria
The criteria used by national FAs in considering a match as a full international were not historically fixed. Particularly for the early decades, and until more recently for FAs outside UEFA and CONMEBOL, counts of caps were often considered unreliable. RSSSF and IFFHS have spent much effort trying to produce definitive lists of full international matches, and corresponding data on players' international caps and goals. Using this data, the following records can be retrospectively produced. Note that, at the time, these records may not have been recognised.

South American record

See also
 Progression of association football caps record (world record)
 List of men's footballers with 100 or more international caps

References
 Players with 100+ Caps and 30+ International Goals RSSSF

Association football record progressions
Association football in South America